This is the page related to the Italian video game magazine. For the unrelated American video game magazine see GamePro.

Game Pro is the Italian edition of Edge video game magazine, specializing in multi-format video games.

History 
Launched in 2007 by Future Media Italy, a division of Future Publishing, as Videogiochi (already under Edge license), the magazine was acquired by the Italian publishing company Sprea Media Italy and renamed Game Pro.

See also
 List of magazines in Italy

External links 
 Game Pro on Sprea Media Italy corporate site 

2007 establishments in Italy
Italian-language magazines
Monthly magazines published in Italy
Video game magazines published in Italy
Magazines established in 2007
Magazines published in Rome